Stefano Pescosolido was the defending champion, but lost in the first round this year.

Andre Agassi won the title, defeating Marcos Ondruska 6–2, 3–6, 6–3 in the final.

Seeds

 n/a
  Andre Agassi (champion)
  MaliVai Washington (quarterfinals)
  Francisco Clavet (first round)
  Brad Gilbert (quarterfinals)
  Fabrice Santoro (first round)
  Emilio Sánchez (quarterfinals)
  Andrei Chesnokov (semifinals)

Draw

Finals

Top half

Bottom half

References

External links
 Singles draw

Singles